Chaarulatha (also spelled as Charulatha) is a 2012 Indian horror film made in Kannada and Tamil. The film was directed by Pon Kumaran, a former associate to K. Bhagyaraj and K. S. Ravikumar, and features Priyamani in the lead role. The film was an adaptation of the Thai horror film Alone which itself was based on My Brothers Keeper an episode of Tale From The Crypt season 2. Sundar C Babu composed the film's music. The film’s story is about conjoined twins. Produced by Global One Studios and distributed by Hansraj Saxena's Sax Pictures.

Charulatha released on 21 September 2012 with dubbed Malayalam and Telugu versions with the same title.

Plot
The story takes it off showing the conjoined twins Charu and Latha. Charu and Latha lived in Vizag as one body and soul until Ravi comes into their lives. Both sisters fall in love with him, however, Ravi falls in love with Charu, causing a rift between her and Latha. Finally, their mother plans to separate their attached bodies through surgery. The surgery, however, results in Latha’s accidental death. Mysterious events begin to unfold as Latha begins to haunt Charu. Several twists take place in line as the story unfolds. She also sees the dead twin playing the violin they used to play in the past and the twin starts to come forward to reach her and disappears as Ravi touches Charu. Later, in the hospital, Ravi visits the twins' mother where she tries to tell Ravi something but is unable to do so. As the problems began to go down, Ravi again visits the twins' mother and she tells him something at the graveyard. Ravi goes to the cemetery, only to find that the real person who died was Charu and that Latha has been impersonating Charu. Flashbacks reveal that after falling in love with Charu, Ravi comes to visit Charu finally as he was leaving town which makes Latha angry. Latha refuses to follow Charu to the balcony to see Ravi for the last time. Ravi leaves after giving a paper to the guard containing a picture of Charu, delighting Charu but leaves Latha outraged. Latha tears the picture angrily and this creates problem between the twins. Latha fights with Charu on the stairs and both of them fall from the stairs. In this, Charu dies and Latha calls her mother to help. After this, both of them are separated. After fighting with Ravi, Latha ties him up to a chair and tells him the truth that she also loved him. Charu’s spirit burns the house in anger and Latha stays inside, refusing to leave unless Ravi tells that he too loves her. Latha's mother scolds and begs Ravi to save her only daughter. Ravi sacrifices his love to save Latha, and reciprocate’s the latter’s feelings. The film ends with Ravi and Latha keeping flowers for Charu at her grave, as Ravi watched Charu’s soul smiling at him as Latha walks towards him, implying that she has blessed their union.

Cast
 Priyamani as Charu and Latha (Dual role)
 Baby Gagana as Child Charu
 Baby Gandhana as Child Latha
 Skanda Ashok as Ravi
 Saranya Ponvannan as Charu and Latha's mother
 Seetha as Ravi's Aunt
 Sai Sasi
  Sunetra Pandith (Kannada) / Aarthi (Tamil) 
 R. N. Sudarshan as a violin class teacher
 P. Ravi Shankar as Priest
 Master Manjunath as Manja / Manga

Production
Priyamani was recruited to enact dual roles as conjoined twins in a film loosely based on the Thai horror film Alone. Skanda Ashok was signed to play the male protagonist. Actors such as Saranya Ponvannan, Seetha and Vettaikaran Sai Sasi were signed on for crucial roles. Yoganand, Shabari and Kalidas penned the dialogues. The budget of the film was reported to be . Priyamani denied that the film was based on the Hollywood film Stuck on You, asserting that it had an "original storyline".

The film went on the floor on Ugadi festival day at Kanteerava studio Bangalore.

Music
The audio launch function of Charulatha was held at Sathyam Cinemas, Chennai. Hansraj Saxena, Dhananjayan Govind, Priyamani, Saranya Ponvannan, composer Vijay Antony, lyricist Madhan Karky alongside directors K. Bhagyaraj, K. S. Ravikumar and R. Kannan graced the event. Ravikumar released the audio and Bhagyaraj received it.

Release 
The film was released in Kannada and Tamil version. The film was also dubbed in Malayalam and Telugu languages. While the Malayalam version was dubbed from Kannada, the Telugu version was dubbed from the Tamil print. While the Kannada version received a U/A certificate from the censor board, the Tamil version received a U certificate.

The film was released on 21 September 2012. The satellite rights of the Tamil Version of film were sold to Sun TV.

Reception 
Charulatha received mixed to positive reviews. A critic from The Times of India scored the film at 3.5 out of 5 stars and says "Priyamani for her amazing performance as Chaaru and Latha. Skanda shines as a loverboy and artist with excellent dialogue delivery, body language and expressions. Ravishankar shines as a tantric practitioner. Music by Sundar B Babu is good. Cinematography by Paneer Selvam is pleasing to the eyes". A critic from The Hindu wrote "Songs or RR, Sundar C. Babu’s music for Charulatha isn’t appealing. But the significant solo violin bits are an exception. For those who wish to watch the spirits of the dead that don’t frighten you much!". B S Srivani from Deccan Herald wrote "Kumar’s screenplay manages to create some drama, heightened by Sundar C Babu. But the sense of déjà vu refuses to go away. The whole ‘lore’ surrounding conjoined twins is left alone, except in a single mention. The viewer has to look for inspiration to get spooked. But then Chaarulatha has enough to rekindle some of that intrigue". A critic from The New Indian Express wrote "Nothing great about Harsha's choreography and Mohan B Kere's art. The Verdict : Though the film cannot be labelled a total horror flick, go watch it for Priyamani's stellar performance". Srikanth Srinivasa from Rediff.com scored the film at 3 out of 5 stars and says "Debutant Skanda is a good find. Sharanya as the mother has a limited role, which could have been expanded given the importance of the subject. Panneer  Selvam's cinematography is good. Chaarulatha is a brilliant film that could have been more emotionally appealing, but watch it for Priya Mani". A critic from Sify.com wrote "The saving grace of the film is Priyamani’s twin role as otherwise the script and presentation is shoddy. There is more comedy elements thrust into the film than the essentials of a horror film".

Box office
The film below average mark at the box office ranging 20% - 35% occupancy on first day collected only  16.6 million (Both versions).The film under performed during its first weekend grossed  40 million (Both versions) despite having huge number of theaters.

Accolades

See also
 Geethaanjali, a 2013 Malayalam-language film with a similar story-line

References

External links
 

Indian horror films
2012 films
Indian remakes of Thai films
Twins in Indian films
2010s Kannada-language films
Indian multilingual films
2010s Tamil-language films
Films scored by Sundar C. Babu
Indian horror film remakes
Fictional conjoined twins
2012 multilingual films
Films directed by Pon Kumaran
2012 horror films